Kariman Shafik (born 1 September 1996) is an Egyptian judoka. She won one of the bronze medals in the women's +78 kg event at the 2019 African Games held in Rabat, Morocco.

A few months earlier, she won one of the bronze medals in the women's +78 kg event at the 2019 African Judo Championships held in Cape Town, South Africa.

Achievements

References

External links 
 

Living people
1996 births
Place of birth missing (living people)
Egyptian female judoka
African Games medalists in judo
African Games bronze medalists for Egypt
Competitors at the 2019 African Games
20th-century Egyptian women
21st-century Egyptian women